In mathematics, a bioctonion, or complex octonion, is a pair (p,q) where p and q are biquaternions. 

The product of two bioctonions is defined using biquaternion multiplication and the biconjugate p → p*:

The bioctonion z = (p,q) has conjugate z* = (p*, – q).

Then norm N(z) of bioctonion z is z z* = p p* + q q*, which is a complex quadratic form with eight terms.

The bioctonion algebra is sometimes introduced as simply the complexification of real octonions, but in abstract algebra it is the result of the Cayley–Dickson construction that begins with the field of complex numbers, the trivial involution, and quadratic form z2. The algebra of bioctonions is an example of an octonion algebra.

For any pair of bioctonions y and z,

showing that N is a quadratic form admitting composition, and hence the bioctonions form a composition algebra.

Complex octonions have been used to describe the generations of quarks and leptons.

References

 J. D. Edmonds (1978) Nine-vectors, complex octonion/quaternion hypercomplex numbers, Lie groups and the ‘real’ world, Foundations of Physics 8(3-4): 303–11,  link from PhilPapers.
 J. Koeplinger & V. Dzhunushaliev (2008) "Nonassociative decomposition of angular momentum operator using complex octonions", presentation at a meeting of the American Physical Society
 D.G. Kabe (1984) "Hypercomplex Multivariate Normal Distribution", Metrika 31(2):63−76 
 A.A. Eliovich & V.I. Sanyuk (2010) "Polynorms", Theoretical and Mathematics Physics 162(2) 135−48 

Composition algebras
Octonions